The Aislers Set is an American indie pop band that formed in San Francisco in 1997, after the breakup of chief songwriter Amy Linton's former band Henry's Dress. The Aislers Set's music is influenced by C86-style British indie pop. The founding members were Linton (guitar, vocals, multi instrumentalist), Wyatt Cusick (guitar, vocals, multi instrumentalist), Alicia Vanden Heuvel, (bass, vocals, piano, multi instrumentalist), Yoshi Nakamoto (drums), & Jen Cohen (organ).  The band was primarily active from 1997-2003, touring the U.S, Europe, and Japan, releasing three self recorded albums, numerous singles and even recording a Peel Session in 2001.

History
Their first record, Terrible Things Happen was released in 1998, receiving glowing reviews in CMJ, The Big Takeover, and numerous indie pop zines, earning enough of a following to generate a tour of Japan in April 1999. Terrible Things Happen (as with the rest of the Aislers Set's music) was recorded in Linton's tiny basement studio and mixed at Cusick/ Vanden Heuvel’s warehouse studio onto an Otari 1/4” analog tape machine, and cut directly to lathe at Fantasy Studios by mastering engineer George Horn, an entirely analogue process.    

Spin.com placed the band's second album The Last Match on its Top 20 of 2000, saying, "Linton has cleared the cobwebs off the Pop conundrum and dolled them up in a perfect dress." On Salon.com, Greil Marcus wrote, "They make dream pop feel as easy to make as a can of soup, and as dangerous: Watch that jagged edge." The album was recorded by the band on Otari 8 track and mixed onto an Otari 1/4” 2 track, again in Linton’s basement and Cusick/ Vanden Heuvel’s home studio.  High praise followed in the New York Times, NME, Gear, and Alternative Press, and the band set out on lengthy tours supporting acts such as Sleater Kinney and Bratmobile.

In the spring of 2001 the band set off on a three-week tour of Europe which was highlighted by an invitation to record a session for legendary British DJ John Peel. They recorded four tracks for the show which was aired twice by Peel. He said of the band "If you were in one of your difficult moods you could argue that there are lots of bands making that kind of noise particularly in the United States of America. And you'd say well, why are Aislers Set better than any of the others and I'd have to say, well I don't know they just sort of are..."

In 2002 the band was invited by Belle and Sebastian for a week-long tour of the East Coast, culminating in a show at New York City’s Hammerstein Ballroom in front of over 3,000 people.  Stevie Jackson of Belle and Sebastian was later quoted in a 2003 SF Weekly article, observing that "[t]hey are one of the best groups in America as far as I'm concerned".

Late in 2002, The San Francisco Chronicle included The Aislers Set in its list of "Young Artists on the Verge," writing, "The Aislers Set's reinvention of '60s pop resurrects walls of garage guitars and rich, Spector-esque sound, insouciance combined with insightful lyrics. But this quintet makes the past feel contemporary, borrowing from punk and pop to create a 21st century cool sound". 
 
The Aislers Set's third album, How I Learned to Write Backwards, came out in spring 2003, recorded on a 16 track that the band purchased themselves, after expanding the space in Linton’s basement studio.  NME wrote "Sleighbells, Cuban trumpets, half-inched Smiths lyrics and chasms of lovely echo all add to an insomnia-like reverie that clings on long after its mere half-hour is up." "When The Aislers Set hit their mark, they unveil a knack for tying together extremes without ever settling for the middle ground" said MOJO magazine. Pitchfork Media stated with respect to the 2003 version of The Aislers Set: "Here, Linton's indie quintet becomes a pop orchestra. The band's music is denser than ever before, laden with sleigh bells, handclaps and horns piled atop the conventional guitars, drums, bass and keyboards-- and all are drenched in cavernous reverb, providing the ambiance and intimacy of a gigantic, empty concert hall".

The band toured for most of 2003 including a month-long stint supporting Yo La Tengo and a week supporting The Shins. 
 
Since late 2003 the band has been on hiatus with Linton having moved to New York City and Cusick moving to Gothenburg, Sweden.

On Christmas Day 2010, the band made a new song, Cold Christmas.

In September 2014, the group reunited to play four West Coast shows in celebration of their LP reissues.

Members
 Amy Linton - vocals, guitar, trumpet, drums
 Wyatt Cusick - guitar, vocals
 Yoshi Nakamoto - drums
 Alicia Vanden Heuvel - bass
 Jen Cohen - organ
 Dan Lee - organ

Contributing members
 Dan Lee - organ
 Gary Olson/Ladybug Transistor - trumpet
 Kevin Barker/Currituck County - guitar
 Michael O'Neill - bass

Discography
 Terrible Things Happen LP/CD (Slumberland Records, September 1998)
 The Last Match LP/CD  (Slumberland Records, May 2000)
 How I Learned To Write Backwards LP (Slumberland Records, February 2003), CD (Suicide Squeeze Records)
 "Been Hiding" b/w "Fire Engines" 7-inch (Slumberland Records)
 "The Walk Pt.1" split 7-inch w/ Poundsign (Slumberland Records)
 "Not To Young To Get Married" split 7-inch w/ Poundsign
 "Hey Lover" split 7-inch w/ The How
 "Yeah Yeah" split w/ The Fairways
 "The Snow Don't Fall" one sided 7-inch (Slumberland Records)
 "The red Door" 7-inch (Slumberland Records)
 " Attraction Action Reaction" 7-inch (Suicide Squeeze Records)
 "Mission Bells" 12-inch (Suicide Squeeze Records)
The Aislers Set's albums were also released in Australia by the Lost & Lonesome Recording Co.; The Last Match was released in the UK by 555 Recordings and Fortuna Pop!.

References

External links
 Official band web site
 The Aislers Set @ myspace
 PUNKCAST#256 live video - Williamsburg Publick House, Brooklyn, March 29, 2003 (RealMedia)

Indie pop groups from San Francisco
Suicide Squeeze Records artists
Slumberland Records artists